In mathematics, and especially topology, a Poincaré complex (named after the mathematician Henri Poincaré) is an abstraction of the singular chain complex of a closed, orientable manifold.

The singular homology and cohomology groups of a closed, orientable manifold are related by Poincaré duality. Poincaré duality is an isomorphism between homology and cohomology groups. A chain complex is called a Poincaré complex if its homology groups and cohomology groups have the abstract properties of Poincaré duality.

A Poincaré space is a topological space whose singular chain complex is a Poincaré complex. These are used in surgery theory to analyze manifold algebraically.

Definition
Assume that there exists a map , called a chain-diagonal, with the property that . Here the map  denotes the ring homomorphism known as the augmentation map, which is defined as follows: if , then .

Using the diagonal as defined above, we are able to form pairings, namely:
,
where  denotes the cap product.

A geometric chain complex is called an algebraic Poincaré complex, of dimension n, if there exists an infinite-ordered element of the n-dimensional homology group, say , such that the maps given by

are group isomorphisms for all . These isomorphisms are the isomorphisms of Poincaré duality.

Example
The singular chain complex of an orientable, closed n-dimensional manifold  is an example of a Poincaré complex, where the duality isomorphisms are given by capping with the fundamental class .

See also
Poincaré space

References

 – especially Chapter 2

External links
 Classifying Poincaré complexes via fundamental triples on the Manifold Atlas

Algebraic topology
Homology theory
Duality theories